Holmes Sterling Morrison Jr. (August 29, 1942 – August 30, 1995) was an American guitarist, best known as one of the founding members of the rock group the Velvet Underground, usually playing electric guitar, occasionally bass guitar, and singing backing vocals.

Unlike bandmates Lou Reed, John Cale, Maureen Tucker and Nico, Morrison never released a solo album or made recordings under his own name. He was nevertheless an essential element of the group's sound as a guitarist whose percussive and syncopated rhythm playing and melodic lead parts provided the foil for Lou Reed's improvisational rhythm and lead guitar riffs.

Biography

Early years
Morrison was born on August 29, 1942, in the Long Island town of East Meadow, New York. He had two brothers and two sisters. His parents divorced when he was young and his mother remarried. He first met future Velvet Underground drummer Maureen Tucker during childhood, through her brother Jim, who attended Division Avenue High School in Levittown, New York, with Morrison. Originally playing trumpet, Morrison switched to guitar after his teacher was drafted.

Morrison majored in English at the City College of New York. While visiting his friend Jim Tucker at Syracuse University, he met Lou Reed, a friend of Tucker and a fellow English student. Before Reed graduated in 1964, they met again in New York City in 1963. By this time, Reed had met John Cale and was interested in starting a band, so when they encountered Morrison, he was invited to join.

The Velvet Underground (1965–1971)

Reed, Cale, Morrison and percussionist Angus MacLise constituted the original line-up of the Velvet Underground, taking the name from Michael Leigh's sadomasochistic novel of the same name. Reed sang and played guitar, Morrison played guitar, Cale played viola, bass and keyboards and MacLise was playing bongos, hand drums, tabla, tambourines and the cimbalom. MacLise was soon replaced by Maureen Tucker.

Morrison primarily played guitar on the band's first two albums, although when Cale, the band's usual bassist, played viola or keyboards in the studio or on stage, Morrison often filled in on bass. Some songs (including "Heroin" and "Sister Ray") had Reed and Morrison on their usual guitars while Cale played viola and Vox Continental organ respectively, with no bass guitar.

There were at least three songs where Cale played both piano and bass while Reed and Morrison played guitars and these were "I'm Waiting for the Man", "Femme Fatale" and "White Light/White Heat" and two songs where Cale played both viola and bass with Reed and Morrison on guitars: "Here She Comes Now" and "The Black Angel's Death Song", the former of which saw Cale doubling on piano. Although Morrison was a proficient bassist (as exemplified by his performances on "Sunday Morning", "Venus in Furs", "All Tomorrow's Parties" and "Lady Godiva's Operation"), he disliked playing the instrument.

After Cale left the group in 1968, Morrison usually exclusively played guitar; however, photographic evidence indicates that he continued to play bass onstage for certain songs if Doug Yule, Cale's replacement, was occupied with organ. Additionally, Morrison frequently sang backing vocals and the occasional lead vocal spot (he recited many verses of Reed's poetry in "The Murder Mystery" and sang one line in "I'm Sticking With You").

Morrison repeatedly remarked that "Venus in Furs", from the band's debut album, was his personal favorite of all of The Velvet Underground's songs, as he felt that the group had achieved with that one track, to a greater degree than any other, the sound the band had in mind.

In 1970, when the band was back in New York City to play an entire summer's engagement at Max's Kansas City, Morrison seized the opportunity to complete his undergraduate degree at the City College of New York. He remained in the Velvet Underground as lead guitarist after Reed left the band in acrimonious circumstances in August 1970. In 1971, however, he began graduate studies at the University of Texas at Austin, where he would earn a PhD in medieval literature (with a dissertation on the four signed poems of Cynewulf) in 1986. Morrison's last performance with the band was on August 21, 1971, at Liberty Hall (Houston, Texas). When it was time for the band to return to New York, Morrison packed an empty suitcase and accompanied them to the gate of their departing plane, before finally telling them he was staying in Texas and leaving the band, the last founding member to quit.

Post-Velvet Underground life (1971–1990)

Morrison began to work on Houston tugboats as a deckhand to supplement his income in the mid-1970s; when he was forced to relinquish his teaching assistantship some years later, he was licensed as a master mariner and became the captain of a Houston tugboat, a vocation he pursued throughout the 1980s.

After leaving the Velvet Underground, Morrison's musical career was primarily limited to informal sessions for personal enjoyment, though he played in a few bands around Austin, Texas, most notably the Bizarros. Morrison's tenure in the capital of Texas made him a well-loved and admired member of the local music community as well as an influential voice. During John Cale's renaissance in the late 1970s, Morrison occasionally sat in with his former bandmate on stages such as the Armadillo World Headquarters in Austin. From the mid-1980s on, he occasionally recorded or performed with Cale, Reed, and particularly Tucker, who had by then started a solo career of her own. Morrison was part of her touring band for most of the late 1980s and early 1990s.

Velvet Underground reunion
In 1992, the core Velvet Underground line-up of Reed, Cale, Morrison and Tucker decided to reform for a tour and possible album. Morrison argued that Doug Yule, who had replaced Cale in 1968, should be included to fill out the sound, but Reed and Cale vetoed him. The band extensively toured Europe in 1993, alternatively as headline act or supporting U2. Morrison's playing held up well, and his performances were generally agreed to be top-notch. But by the end of the tour, relationships had soured again and plans for a US tour and MTV Unplugged album were scrapped and as a result, the European tour turned out to be the last for the Velvet Underground. Morrison joined Maureen Tucker's band for a tour in 1994.

Death
In late 1994, Morrison was diagnosed with non-Hodgkin's lymphoma; and, as his health deteriorated, he could no longer play guitar. He was visited by his former bandmates Reed and Tucker; according to Reed, when he visited Morrison for the last time, he was bedridden, had lost weight and his hair, but never complained about his lymphoma and described it as "leaves in the fall".

Morrison died of non-Hodgkin's lymphoma on August 30, 1995, one day after his 53rd birthday.

Legacy
Upon their induction in the Rock and Roll Hall of Fame in 1996, Reed, Cale and Tucker performed a song titled "Last Night I Said Goodbye to My Friend", which was dedicated to Morrison.

In March 2001, Morrison was remembered through a tribute set at the Austin Music Awards during the South by Southwest Festival. John Cale performed "Some Friends", a song he had composed in Morrison's memory, with Alejandro Escovedo, who played the Galaxie 500 song "Tugboat", also written for Morrison. An SXSW panel on Sterling successfully convened that year, with Cale and others remembering their fallen friend. Morrison was also the subject of an oral history, Velvet Underdog, in The Austin Chronicle that year. The story utilised quotes by Cale, Reed, Tucker, and other Morrison associates.

The Galaxie 500 song "Tugboat" alludes to Morrison's post-Velvet Underground career. Morrison was a major influence on Dean Wareham.

Personal life
Morrison's surviving family includes his widow, Martha (whom he married in 1971), his son, Thomas, and his daughter, Mary Anne, all of whom reside in Poughkeepsie, New York.

Guitar style
During the Cale era, there was no established "lead" or "rhythm" guitar hierarchy in the Velvet Underground; both Reed and Morrison traded roles regularly. From the third album on though, Morrison almost always took the role of lead guitarist as Reed concentrated more on his singing and rhythm playing.

Morrison and Reed's guitars were essentially duelling guitars that complemented each other, alternating between lead lines and rhythm parts interchangeably and with no assigned roles on who was lead or rhythm. Relative to Reed's improvisational and experimental guitar style, Morrison's guitar style was generally syncopated and more percussive with cleaner melodic lead parts. Praising his late bandmate's guitar playing, Reed told David Fricke, "Sometimes, I think his guitar playing is very much like his first name – sterling. It's involved. And yet it has a grace and elegance to it, even in the fast-note runs. You could play me a hundred guitars, and I could spot Sterling."

Doug Yule, who joined the Velvet Underground later, stated that Morrison's greatest influence as a guitarist was Mickey Baker, a blues and R&B stylist known for "Love Is Strange", a hit single from 1957 as part of Mickey and Sylvia.

Songwriting credits
While Reed was the main writer, there has been some conjecture that both Morrison and Cale made more songwriting contributions than is specified in the credits as Morrison later told Victor Bockris, "Lou really did want to have a whole lot of credit for the songs, so on nearly all of the albums we gave it to him. It kept him happy. He got the rights to all the songs on Loaded so now he's credited for being the absolute and singular genius of the Underground, which is not true. There are a lot of songs I should have coauthorship on, and the same holds true for John Cale. The publishing company was called Three Prong because there were three of us involved. I'm the last person to deny Lou's immense contribution and he's the best songwriter of the three of us. But he wanted all the credit, he wanted it more than we did, and he got it, to keep the peace." Nevertheless, Morrison got co-writing credits on "European Son", "Here She Comes Now", "The Gift", "Sister Ray", "Hey Mr. Rain", "Ride into the Sun", "Foggy Notion", "Ferryboat Bill", "I'm Gonna Move Right In", "Coney Island Steeplechase" and "Guess I'm Falling in Love". He also co-wrote "Chelsea Girls" with Reed, the title track to Nico's debut solo album.

Discography with the Velvet Underground
Only recordings with Morrison are listed. For the band's full discography, please see the Velvet Underground article.

Singles
"All Tomorrow's Parties" / "I'll Be Your Mirror" (1966)
"Sunday Morning" / "Femme Fatale" (1966)
"White Light/White Heat" / "Here She Comes Now" (1968)
"What Goes On" / "Jesus" (promo, 1969)
"Who Loves the Sun" / "Oh! Sweet Nuthin'" (1971)
"Foggy Notion" / "I Can't Stand It" (promo, 1985)
"Venus in Furs" / "I'm Waiting for the Man" (live, 1994)

Original albums
The Velvet Underground & Nico (1967)
White Light/White Heat (1968)
The Velvet Underground (1969)
Loaded (1970)
Live at Max's Kansas City (1972)
Live MCMXCIII (1993)

Later releases of archive material
1969: The Velvet Underground Live (1974)
VU (1985)
Another View (1986)
Chronicles (1991)
Peel Slowly and See (box set, 1995)
Bootleg Series Volume 1: The Quine Tapes (live, 2001)
The Very Best of the Velvet Underground (2003)
The Complete Matrix Tapes (live, 2015)

Additional recording history
Nico – Chelsea Girl  (1967)
Plays guitar on "Chelsea Girls" (which includes a rare Morrison writing credit) and "Wrap Your Troubles in Dreams"
Moe Tucker – I Spent a Week There the Other Night  (1992)
Plays electric guitar on "Too Shy"; plays 12-string guitar on "Blue, All the Way to Canada"
Luna – Bewitched  (1994)
Plays guitar on "Friendly Advice" and "Great Jones Street"
Moe Tucker – Dogs Under Stress  (1994)
Plays guitar on "Me, Myself and I", "I Don't Understand", "Little Girl" and "I Wanna"; plays electric sitar on "Danny Boy"
John Cale – Antártida (1995)
Plays guitar on "People Who Died"
Inside the Dream Syndicate Vol.III: Stainless Steel Gamelan (Table of the Elements 2002)
Personnel: Terry Jennings, Angus MacLise, John Cale, Sterling Morrison

References

External links

1942 births
1995 deaths
American rock guitarists
American male guitarists
Lead guitarists
Rhythm guitarists
American male songwriters
Songwriters from New York (state)
American rock bass guitarists
American male bass guitarists
The Velvet Underground members
Deaths from non-Hodgkin lymphoma
University of Texas at Austin alumni
Deaths from cancer in New York (state)
People from East Meadow, New York
Musicians from Austin, Texas
Musicians from Houston
Protopunk musicians
People from Levittown, New York
20th-century American singers
American sailors
Guitarists from New York City
Guitarists from Texas
20th-century American guitarists
People associated with The Factory
20th-century bass guitarists
20th-century American male singers